The Tanzania National Parks Authority commonly known as TANAPA is responsible for the management of Tanzania's national parks. TANAPA is a parastatal corporation and all its income is reinvested into the organization. It is governed by a number of instruments including the National Parks Act, Chapter 282 of the 2002 and the  Wildlife Conservation Act No. 5 of 2009. TANAPA manages the nation's 22 National parks which covers approximately 15% of the land area and has the mandate to conserve and manage the wildlife in Tanzania, and to enforce the related laws and regulations in this industry. It manages the biodiversity of the country, protecting and conserving the flora and fauna. The organization does not have a mandate over the game reserves such as the Selous Game Reserve which is managed by the Tanzanian Wildlife Division and the Ngorongoro Conservation Area managed by the Ngorongoro Conservation Authority.

The Arusha Manifesto gave the initial foundation for the expansion of the Tanzanian National Park authority and an increase in protected areas in the country, as of December 2015 parks, reserves and conservation areas cover about 14% percent of the land. Currently TANAPA is governed by the National Parks Ordinance Chapter 282 of the 2002 and manages 22 national parks.

National Parks

TANAPA manages 22 national parks covering an area of  approximately the land area of Croatia. TANAPA is responsible for the following parks:

 Arusha National Park
 Burigi-Chato National Park
 Gombe Stream National Park
 Ibanda-Kyerwa National Park
 Katavi National Park
 Kigosi National Park
 Kilimanjaro National Park
 Kitulo National Park
 Lake Manyara National Park
 Mahale Mountains National Park
 Mikumi National Park
 Mkomazi National Park
 Nyerere National Park
 Ruaha National Park
 Rubondo Island National Park
 Rumanyika-Karagwe National Park
 Saadani National Park
 Saanane Island National Park
 Serengeti National Park
 Tarangire National Park
 Udzungwa Mountains National Park
 Ugalla River National Park

Statistics
TANAPA's main source of revenue is sourced from tourist arrivals. TANAPA in collaboration with the Tanzania Tourist Board markets the national parks locally and internationally to attract visitors. TANAPA has also been mandated to promote domestic tourism.

Principal activities

It is TANAPA's first and foremost goal to protect the wildlife and natural resources living in the park and to ensure tourists do not cause damage to the ecosystem. The organization has received various donations of vehicles and aircraft to help train rangers with modern technology and techniques.

TANAPA also pays to maintain the park facilities for tourists and conservation activities such as Roads, Gates, Boundaries and Airstrips. TANAPA currently manages 26 airstrips throughout its network of national parks. Often forest fires break out in the parks and it is under TANAPA's mandate to put them out. The authority also has in place a Fire management plan implemented yearly which help reducing number of destructive insect e.g. tsetse fly, help reduce the amount of litter that can catalyze a fire during dry season and also early burning of the grass helps facilitate new forage for animals.

See also

List of protected areas of Tanzania
Ministry of Natural Resources and Tourism
Tanzania Wildlife Research Institute

References

External links
Official Website

N
Nature conservation in Tanzania
National park administrators